The Washington Air Defense Sector  (WaADS) is an inactive United States Air Force organization.  Its last assignment was with the Air Defense Command (ADC) 26th Air Division,  being stationed at Fort Lee Air Force Station (AFS), Virginia.  It was inactivated on 1 April 1966.

History 
WaADS was established in December 1956 as the 4625th Air Defense Wing. It was not assigned any units until 1958 when it assumed control of former ADC Eastern Air Defense Force units primarily in Maryland, Delaware, and Virginia.  Units of the 32d Air Division in North and South Carolina were transferred to WaADS in 1961 as the 26th Air Division area of responsibility expanded southward. The organization provided command and control over several aircraft, missile and radar squadrons.

On 1 February 1959 the new Semi Automatic Ground Environment (SAGE) Direction Center (DC-04) became operational.    DC-04 was equipped with dual AN/FSQ-7 Computers.   The day-to-day operations of the command were to train and maintain tactical units flying jet interceptor aircraft (F-101 Voodoo; F-102 Delta Dagger; F-106 Delta Dart) or interceptor missiles (CIM-10 Bomarc) in a state of readiness with training missions and series of exercises with Strategic Air Command and other units simulating interceptions of incoming enemy aircraft.

The sector was eliminated on 1 April 1966 due to a general reorganization of Air Defense Command, most of its assigned units being reassigned  to the 33d Air Division

Lineage
 Designated as 4625th Air Defense Wing, SAGE and organized on 1 December 1956
 Redesignated Washington Air Defense Sector on 8 January 1957
 Discontinued and inactivated on 1 April 1966

Assignments 
 85th Air Division, 1 December 1956
 26th Air Division, 1 September 1958 – 1 April 1966

Stations 
 Fort Lee AFS, Virginia, 1 December 1956 – 1 April 1966

Components

Interceptor squadrons
 48th Fighter-Interceptor Squadron
 Langley Air Force Base (AFB), Virginia, 1 September 1958 - 1 April 1966
 95th Fighter-Interceptor Squadron
 Andrews AFB, Maryland, 1 September 1958 - 1 July 1963
 444th Fighter-Interceptor Squadron
 Charleston AFB, South Carolina, 1 July 1961 - 1 April 1966
 482d Fighter-Interceptor Squadron
 Seymour Johnson AFB, North Carolina, 1 July 1961 - 1 October 1965

Missile squadron
 22d Air Defense Missile Squadron (BOMARC)
 Langley AFB, Virginia, 1 September 1959 - 1 April 1966

Radar squadrons

 614th Aircraft Control & Warning Squadron (later 614th Radar Squadron(SAGE))
 Cherry Point Marine Corps Air Station, North Carolina, 1 July 1961 - 1 August 1963
 632nd Aircraft Control & Warning Squadron (later 632d Radar Squadron (SAGE))
 Roanoke Rapids AFS, North Carolina, 1 September 1958 - 1 April 1966
 647th Aircraft Control & Warning Squadron (later 647th Radar Squadron SAGE))
 Manassas AFS, Virginia, 1 September 1958 - 25 June 1965
 649th Aircraft Control & Warning Squadron (later 649th Radar Squadron (SAGE))
 Bedford AFS, Virginia, 1 September 1958 - 1 April 1966
 701st Aircraft Control & Warning Squadron (later 701st Radar Squadron (SAGE))
 Fort Fisher AFS, North Carolina, 1 July 1961 - 1 April 1966

 770th Radar Squadron (SAGE)
 Fort George G. Meade, Maryland, 1 October 1961 - 1 April 1966
 771st Aircraft Control & Warning Squadron (later 771st Radar Squadron (SAGE))
 Cape Charles AFS, Virginia, 1 September 1958 - 1 April 1966
 792nd Aircraft Control & Warning Squadron (later 792d Radar Squadron (SAGE))
 North Charleston AFS, South Carolina, 1 July 1961 - 1 April 1966
 810th Aircraft Control & Warning Squadron (later 810th Radar Squadron (SAGE))
 Winston-Salem AFS, North Carolina, 1 July 1961 - 1 April 1966

Weapons Systems
 F-101B 1961-1966
 F-102A, 1958-1965
 F-106A, 1959-1966
 IM-99 (later CIM-10), 1959-1966

See also
 List of USAF Aerospace Defense Command General Surveillance Radar Stations
 Aerospace Defense Command Fighter Squadrons
 List of MAJCOM wings
 List of United States Air Force aircraft control and warning squadrons

Notes

References

 
 
 
 Photos of Washington Air Defense Sector SAGE facilities

External links
 Radomes.org Washington Air Defense Sector

Air defense sectors of the United States Air Force
1956 establishments in Virginia
1966 disestablishments in Virginia
Military units and formations disestablished in 1966
Military units and formations established in 1956
Military units and formations in Virginia